The 24th Golden Horse Awards (Mandarin:第24屆金馬獎) took place on October 29, 1987 at Taipei City Arts Promotion Office in Taipei, Taiwan.

References

24th
1987 film awards
1987 in Taiwan